Zaandam Kogerveld is a railway station located in Zaandam, Netherlands. The station opened in 1989 on the Zaandam–Enkhuizen railway. The station is 2 km north of Zaandam railway station, and is in the Kogerveld estate. This station is a Zaandam suburb station. Hoornseveld and 't Kalf are two other estates in the area.

Residents from Koog aan de Zaan also use this station for Purmerend and Hoorn.

Train services
The following services currently call at Zaandam Kogerveld.
2x per hour local service (sprinter) Hoofddorp - Zaandam - Hoorn Kersenboogerd

Bus services

 63
 64
 391
 395
 N62

Railway stations opened in 1989
1989 establishments in the Netherlands
Railway stations in North Holland
Kogerveld railway station
Railway stations in the Netherlands opened in the 20th century